Molesworth Street is a street in Dublin, Ireland named after Richard Molesworth, 3rd Viscount Molesworth and links the more notable Dawson Street with Kildare Street and lies just over 200 m to the north of St. Stephens Green in Dublin's central business district.

History and environs

Molesworth Street is named after Richard Molesworth, 3rd Viscount Molesworth. and was originally known as "Molesworth Fields". Acknowledged as the first adaption of Early English style to street architecture in the city of Dublin.

One of the most important building is Freemasons' Hall, home of the Grand Lodge of Ireland designed by the architect Edward Holmes of Birmingham and completed in 1866 on the site of the townhouse of the first grandmaster, the Earl of Rosse.

Buswells Hotel, which comprises three adjoining Georgian buildings, is frequented by politicians due to its proximity to Irish government buildings.

10 Molesworth Street was re-constructed around 2017 as a  building and was the first to achieve a platinum LEED sustainability accreditation.

Both houses of the Oireachtas are located in Leinster House, Kildare Street (adjacent to Molesworth Street).

St Anne's Schools and Molesworth Hall
In 1857, numbers 38 to 44 of the street were the site of the building of the St Anne's School, replacing what had previously been a terrace of Queen Anne style houses demolished some time before 1843. The school's foundation stone was laid on 7 March 1857. Designed by architects Deane and Woodward, it was a freestanding building comprising the earliest adaptation of early English architectural style in Dublin. Built of Portland, Calp, and Caen stone, with red brick, the building had horizontal bands of contrasting materials, which was very much the architectural fashion of the time. The adjoining also freestanding Molesworth hall was added later around 1867 after the death of Woodward.

The school, hall and an adjoining brick building in the manner of Frederick Darley were purchased by the property developer Patrick Gallagher. The Hall was the venue for the first staging of Riders to the Sea by John Millington Synge. Gallagher wanted to replace the buildings with an office block designed by Desmond FitzGerald. The planners wanted any new design to incorporate at least the historic facades, but as they were not listed for protection, this was not enforced. FitzGerald described the buildings as "decrepit business premises". Planning permission was granted to demolish the buildings in 1974, and Gallagher expanded the site by buying up a series of buildings between these two and the corner of Dawson Street. When demolition of Molesworth Hall began in 1978, several groups, including from An Taisce and local architecture students, began a protest. In response, Gallagher threatened to lay off 300 workers, which ultimately resulted in work resuming. The EEC Commission and StanChart Bank were the first tenants of the new office block.

See also

List of streets and squares in Dublin

References

Further reading

External links

Archiseek.com - Molesworth Street

Streets in Dublin (city)